The 1912 Brooklyn Trolley Dodgers finished in seventh place with a 65–76 record.

Offseason 
 December 1911: Doc Scanlan was traded by the Trolley Dodgers to the Philadelphia Phillies for Eddie Stack.

Regular season

Season standings

Record vs. opponents

Notable transactions 
 May 7, 1912: Red Downs was purchased from the Trolley Dodgers by the Chicago Cubs.
 July 10, 1912: Cliff Curtis was purchased by the Trolley Dodgers from the Philadelphia Phillies.

Roster

Player stats

Batting

Starters by position 
Note: Pos = Position; G = Games played; AB = At bats; H = Hits; Avg. = Batting average; HR = Home runs; RBI = Runs batted in

Other batters 
Note: G = Games played; AB = At bats; H = Hits; Avg. = Batting average; HR = Home runs; RBI = Runs batted in

Pitching

Starting pitchers 
Note: G = Games pitched; IP = Innings pitched; W = Wins; L = Losses; ERA = Earned run average; SO = Strikeouts

Other pitchers 
Note: G = Games pitched; IP = Innings pitched; W = Wins; L = Losses; ERA = Earned run average; SO = Strikeouts

Relief pitchers 
Note: G = Games pitched; W = Wins; L = Losses; SV = Saves; ERA = Earned run average; SO = Strikeouts

References

External links
1912 Brooklyn Dodgers Statistics at Baseball Reference
1912 Brooklyn Superbas Roster at Baseball Almanac
The 1912 Brooklyn Superbas at Retrosheet
1912 Brooklyn Trolley Dodgers uniform
Brooklyn Dodgers reference site
Acme Dodgers page 

Los Angeles Dodgers seasons
Brooklyn Dodgers season
Brook
1910s in Brooklyn
Park Slope